Love and a .45 is the soundtrack album to the 1994 road film of the same name.

Track listing

References

1994 soundtrack albums
Film soundtracks

Immortal Records albums